Spain has the following men´s national youth basketball teams:

 Spain national under-20 basketball team
 Spain national under-19 basketball team
 Spain national under-18 basketball team
 Spain national under-17 basketball team
 Spain national under-16 basketball team

Overview of results of the men's national youth teams 

U-